The 1997 Asian Badminton Championships was the 16th edition of the Badminton Asia Championships. It was held in Stadium Negara, Kuala Lumpur, Malaysia, from September 3 to September 5 with total prize money of 136,000 US Dollars. At the end of competitions, China took titles from four disciplines; Both the singles and Women's & Mixed doubles, while Indonesia won Men's doubles discipline.

Medalists

Medal table

Final Results

Men's singles

Women's singles

Men's doubles

Women's doubles

Mixed doubles

See also
 Medalists at the Badminton Asia Championships

References 

Badminton Asia Championships
Asian Badminton Championships
1997 Badminton Asia Championships
Badminton Asia Championships
Badminton Asia Championships